Affinity Photo is a raster graphics editor developed by Serif Ltd. for iOS, macOS, and Windows, alongside Affinity Designer and Affinity Publisher. Development of Affinity Photo started in 2009 as a raster graphics editor for macOS. Its first version reached general availability in 2015 with the Windows version launched a year later. It is a successor to PhotoPlus which Serif discontinued in 2017.

Functionality 
Affinity Photo has been described as an Adobe Photoshop alternative, and is compatible with common file formats such as Adobe's PSD (including Photoshop Smart Objects). Functionality includes RAW processing, color space options, live preview of effects, image stitching, alpha compositing, black point compensation, and optical aberration corrections. Working in Affinity Photo is always live, with pan and zoom at 60fps and non-destructive editing. It supports unlimited layers and a dedicated workspace for developing RAW photos; as well as RGB, CMYK, LAB, Greyscale color spaces with ICC color management and 16-bit per channel editing.

Affinity Photo is not an image organizer like Apple Aperture or Adobe Lightroom.

Development
Affinity Photo began as a raster graphics editor solely for macOS. It was Serif's second macOS app after Affinity Designer and, like that app, was built from the ground up to leverage core native technologies, including Grand Central Dispatch, Core Graphics, OpenGL and Metal 2 hardware acceleration.

Serif established an R&D team for Affinity Photo in 2009, headed by lead designer Andy Somerfield. A free beta test version was released to the public on 9 February 2015. The initial stable release of Affinity Photo, version 1.3.1, launched on the Mac App Store on 9 July 2015 for macOS 10.7 and later. In August Version 1.3.5 was released providing numerous bug fixes and improvements. Version 1.4, in December 2015, added panorama photo stitching, support for macOS 10.11 El Capitan including six Affinity extensions for Apple Photos, and augmented the languages supported in previous versions (English (US and UK), German, French and Spanish) with Italian, Portuguese (Brazilian), and Japanese. Versions 1.4.1 and 1.4.2 in January and June 2016 provided stability and bug fixes, and the app was optimized for macOS 10.12 Sierra with version 1.4.3 in September 2016.

In December, 2016, Serif launched Affinity Photo for Windows and released version 1.5.1 for macOS at the same time, adding a 32-bit RGB editing mode with support for 32-bit file formats and more than 70 new camera RAW file formats, as well as the ability to develop RAW files directly into a 32-bit document. It also added support for the new MacBook Pro with Touchbar.

Affinity Photo for iPad was launched during the keynote at Apple's WWDC in San Jose on 5 June 2017. In September 2017, the iPad version was updated for compatibility with Apple's new iOS 11. Major updates to Affinity Photo, as well as to Affinity Designer, were released in November 2017. Affinity Photo 1.6.6 was optimized for macOS 10.13 High Sierra (and Metal 2 acceleration), better integration with Apple Photos, improved Photoshop Plugins support, and added an option to switch between a dark or light user interface. Serif discontinued PhotoPlus in 2017. 

In February 2020, version 1.8 added support for Photoshop smart objects in PSD files, and expanded plug-in compatibility, with focus on DxO's Nik Collection of plug-ins.

Reception
The macOS version of Affinity Photo was received favorably by professional photographers, and Apple named it as the best Mac app of 2015. In 2016, Affinity Photo was awarded the prize for Best Imaging Software by the Technical Image Press Association (TIPA) at Photokina. In November 2017, the iOS app was named by Apple as its best iPad app of the year, and Tom's Guide selected Affinity Photo for their first list of Best Tech Values. In February 2019, Affinity Photo received Amateur Photographer's Software of the Year award, followed by Photography News' Best Software award in March 2019.

See also 
Comparison of raster graphics editors

References

Further reading

External links
 

Raster graphics editors
Photo software
HDR tone mapping software
MacOS graphics software
Windows graphics-related software
Proprietary cross-platform software
2015 software
Raw image processing software